The Greenland Airports is the national airport operator of the airports in Greenland, in charge of airport upgrades and associated fees and taxes in all airports in Greenland.

Owned by the Government of Greenland, it operates 13 airports, all of which can accommodate fixed-wing STOL operations year-round, and two can handle airliners. It also operates a large, countrywide network of 43 heliports, of which 8 are primary heliports, while the rest are considered helistops.

The company employs over 400 people, mainly staffing the main airports. Most of the helistops are staffed by Air Greenland. Greenland Airports also owns two airport hotels, at Kangerlussuaq and Narsarsuaq. It also operates an AFIS school at Narsarsuaq. Greenland Airports is supervised by the Danish Transport Authority regarding safety rules and other regulations.

For all the airports operated by the authority, see the List of airports in Greenland.

In 2016 the state owned company Kalaallit Airports A/S was formed. It shall build or rebuild (extend) the airports in Nuuk, Ilulissat and Qaqortoq, starting 2018, and thereafter own them.

International airports

References 

Airport operators
Transport companies of Greenland
Government-owned companies of Greenland
Air navigation service providers
Companies based in Nuuk
Aviation in Greenland